The United Sabah National Organisation (New)) is a political party in Sabah, Malaysia. The party was formed in 2013 with the aim of reviving the long-buried struggle of USNO Sabah. The establishment of the new USNO Party was inspired by the struggle of Tun Mustapha Harun in the dissolved USNO Party in favor of peninsula-based UMNO. This party is also the main component party of the Gabungan Rakyat Sabah Party (GRS) since 2022.

The new United Sabah National Organisation (USNO Baru) was one of 20 new political parties approved nationwide by the Registrar of Societies (RoS) in 2013. It was the successor of the old United Sabah National Organisation (Usno), founded by Sabah's third chief minister Datu Mustapha Harun in 1967 and deregistered by the RoS in 1996.

Leadership
Ibrahim Linggam was elected as party president in November 2018, replacing pro-tem president Dulli Tiaseh, and its office-bearers ending five years of hiatus due to an internal squabble over who among three of its leaders should be president since the new party's inception in 2013.

The party contested in the 2020 state elections, failing to win a single seat.

Former national parliament Speaker Pandikar Amin Mulia was elected party president in February 2021.

Affiliation
On 2021, USNO has made an application to join the Gabungan Rakyat Sabah alliance.

On 9 May 2022, The United Sabah National Organisation (USNO) has been accepted as a new main component party of the Gabungan Rakyat Sabah coalition party.

See also 
 Politics of Malaysia
 List of political parties in Malaysia
 United Sabah National Organisation (Old)
 Gabungan Rakyat Sabah Party (Registered political coalition)

Notes

References

External links 
 
 

Political parties in Sabah
Political parties established in 2013
2013 establishments in Malaysia